A Friends meeting house is a meeting house of the Religious Society of Friends (Quakers), where meeting for worship is usually held.

Typically, Friends meeting houses are simple and resemble local residential buildings. Steeples, spires, and ornamentation are usually avoided.

When Quakers speak of a "church," it generally refers to the persons of the worshipping community, rather than the building itself.

History
Generally, Quakers believe that meeting for worship can occur in any place - not just in a designated meeting house. Quakers have quoted  to support this: "Where two or three meet together in my name, there [is God] in the midst of them." Therefore, theoretically, meeting for worship may be held anywhere.

Before the advent of meeting houses, Quakers met for worship outdoors, in homes, or in local buildings. 

In the late 17th century, Welsh Quaker Richard Davies (1635-1708) described his experience meeting Friends outdoors:I went to visit [four] young men, my former companions in profession of religion. Two of them were convinced [Quakers]...we agreed to meet together; but none of us had a house of his own to meet in. We determined therefore to meet on a hill in a common, as near as we could for the convenience of each other, we living some miles apart. There we met in silence, to the wonder of the country. When the rain and the weather beat upon us on one side of the hill, we went to the other side. We were not free to go into any neighbours' enclosures, for they were so blind, dark, and ignorant, that they looked upon us as witches, and would go away from us, some crossing themselves with their hands about their foreheads and faces.In 1662, John Bowne was arrested by Peter Stuyvesant for holding Quaker worship at his 1661 house in Flushing, Queens, then part of New Netherland. Bowne was deported to Holland and placed before a panel from the Dutch West India Company. After claiming that the Dutch colony had reached a religious-freedom agreement with his community, Bowne was set free. Two years later in 1664, the British took control of New Amsterdam and promised more religious freedom for colonists.

Perhaps due to the growth of the Religious Society of Friends, or due to discrimination, there arose a need for buildings to house meetings.

In 1670, Friends in England built the first worship-purposed meeting house. The Hertford Meeting House is located in 48 Railway Street, Hertford, East Hertfordshire. This is the oldest Quaker building in the world, still in use for worship meetings. It was thrice visited by Quaker founder George Fox.

In December 1672, while traveling in Wales, Fox stated that his group "had a large meeting in the justice's barn, for [the justice's] house could not hold the company." This shows that holding meeting for worship at home was common in areas where a meeting house was not available.

In 1682, the Third Haven Meeting House in Talbot County, Maryland was built. This is considered the oldest surviving Friends meeting house in America. 

Some Friends meeting houses were adapted from existing structures, but most were purpose-built. The 1765 Brigflatts Meeting House in Cumbria, England is an example of the latter. The hallmark of a meeting house is extreme simplicity and the absence of any liturgical symbols. More specifically, though, the defining characteristics of the Quaker meetinghouse are simplicity, equality, community, and peace. Though never explicitly written or spoken about, these tenets (or “Testimonies”) of Quakerism were the basic, and only, guidelines for building a meetinghouse, as was seen through the continuity of the use of Testimonies within meetinghouse design. While meetinghouse design evolved over time to a standardization of the double-cell structure without explicit guidelines for building, the meeting house's reflective architecture revealed a deeper meaning. The meeting house design manifested and enhanced Quaker Testimonies and the cultivation of the Inner Light that was essential to Friends. Quakers easily moved from one place of meeting to another, but when given the opportunity to design and construct their own place of meeting, Friends infused their Testimonies in the planning, design, and construction of the building.

Description 
Quaker meeting houses generally lack spires, steeples, and other architectural decorations to embrace simplicity. Colonial American Quakers built meeting houses that resembled residential homes to display the building's role in the community, avoiding "churchly" ornamentation.

While imprisoned for his beliefs in 1665, Quaker founder George Fox had a conversation wherein he explained "church" terminology and derided steeples:

The meeting house/church distinction is shared by a number of other non-conformist Christian denominations, including Unitarians, Christadelphians, the Church of Jesus Christ of Latter-day Saints (Mormons), and Mennonites.

Meeting Houses built in a traditional style usually had two meeting rooms: one for the main meeting for worship, and another where the women's business meeting may be held (often referred to as the women's meeting room).  Meeting houses of this style usually have a minister's gallery at one end of the meeting room, where traditionally those traveling in the ministry would have sat, with an elders bench immediately in front of this.  Wooden benches facing this occupy the rest of the room, often with a gallery for extra seating.  Meeting houses of this style usually have high windows so that worshippers sitting in meeting for worship cannot see outside.

Meeting houses built in a more modern design will usually consist of: a large meeting room, smaller rooms for committees, children's classes, etc., a kitchen and toilets.

The meeting room itself is a place for Friends to withdraw from the world. The windows are set sufficiently high that worshippers will not be distracted by the activities of the world's people outside, or in some cases they provide a view into the meeting house garden. The seating was originally long, hard and wooden. Today it is usually separate chairs but the layout remains the same – a square or rectangle facing inwards to a central table.

Examples

Australia
 Friends Meeting House, Adelaide

France
 The historic meeting house of Congénies (Southern France), since 1788

Ireland
 Quaker Meetinghouse, Moate, County Westmeath
 Friends Meeting House, 4–5 Eustace Street, Dublin

United States

 Abington Friends Meeting House, Montgomery County, Pennsylvania
 Alloways Creek Friends Meetinghouse, Hancock's Bridge, Lower Alloways Creek Township, Salem County, New Jersey
 Amesbury Friends Meeting House
 Appoquinimink Friends Meetinghouse, Odessa, Delaware
 Arch Street Friends Meeting House, Philadelphia, Pennsylvania
 Arney's Mount Friends Meetinghouse and Burial Ground, Burlington County, New Jersey
 Beekman Meeting House and Friends' Cemetery, LaGrangeville, New York
 Benjaminville Friends Meeting House, McLean County, Illinois
 Birmingham Orthodox Meeting House, Birmingham Township, Chester County, Pennsylvania
John Bowne House, Flushing, New York, 1661
 Bradford Friends Meetinghouse (Marshallton Meeting House), Marshallton, West Bradford Township, Chester County, Pennsylvania
 Brooklyn Friends Meetinghouse and School, Downtown Brooklyn, New York, New York
 Caln Meeting House, Caln Township, Chester County, Pennsylvania
 Camden Friends Meetinghouse, Camden, Delaware
 Catawissa Friends Meetinghouse, Catawissa, Columbia County, Pennsylvania
 Centre Meeting and Schoolhouse, Centerville, New Castle County, Delaware
 Chappaqua Friends Meeting House, Westchester County, NY built in 1754
 Chichester Friends Meetinghouse, near Boothwyn, Upper Chichester Township, Delaware County, Pennsylvania
 Clinton Corners Friends Church, Clinton Corners, Dutchess County, New York
 Colora Meetinghouse, Colora, Cecil County, Maryland
 Conanicut Friends Meetinghouse, Conanicut Island, Jamestown, Newport County, Rhode Island
 Concord Friends Meetinghouse, Concordville, Delaware County, Pennsylvania
 Concord Hicksite Friends Meeting House, east of Colerain, Belmont County, Ohio
 Cornwall Friends Meeting House
 Creek Meeting House and Friends' Cemetery, Clinton Corners, Dutchess County, New York
 Crum Elbow Meeting House and Cemetery, East Park, Dutchess County, New York
 Deer Creek Friends Meetinghouse, Darlington, Harford County, Maryland
 Deep River Friends Meeting House and Cemetery, High Point, North Carolina
 Dover, NH Friends Meetinghouse, Dover, Strafford County, New Hampshire
 East Hoosac Quaker Meetinghouse, Adams, Berkshire County, Massachusetts
 East Nottingham Friends Meetinghouse or Brick Meetinghouse, Rising Sun, Cecil County, Maryland
 Easton Friends North Meetinghouse, Middle Falls in Washington County, New York
 Evesham Friends Meeting House, Mount Laurel Township, Burlington County, New Jersey
 Frankford Friends Meeting House, Frankford neighborhood, Philadelphia, Pennsylvania
 Frankford Monthly Meeting, Frankford neighborhood, Philadelphia, Pennsylvania
 Free Quaker Meetinghouse, Independence National Historical Park, Philadelphia, Pennsylvania
 Friends Meetinghouse (Uxbridge, Massachusetts)
 Friends Meetinghouse, Wilmington, Delaware
 Friends Meeting House and Cemetery, Little Compton, Rhode Island
 Great Friends Meeting House
 Green Plain Monthly Meetinghouse, near South Charleston, Clark County, Ohio
 Greenfield Preparative Meeting House (Catskill Meeting House), Grahamsville, Sullivan County, New York
 Haverford Friends Meeting, Haverford, Pennsylvania
 Hockessin Friends Meetinghouse, Hockessin, New Castle County, Delaware
 Honey Creek Friends' Meetinghouse, New Providence, Iowa
 Hopewell Meeting House, Clear Brook, near Winchester, Virginia
 Jericho Friends Meeting House Complex, Jericho, Nassau County, New York
 Little Egg Harbor Friends Meeting House, Tuckerton, New Jersey
 Little Falls Meetinghouse, Fallston, Harford County, Maryland
 Live Oak Friends Meeting House, Houston, Texas
 Meeting House of the Friends Meeting of Washington, Washington, DC
 Merion Friends Meeting House, Merion Station, Lower Merion Township, Montgomery County, Pennsylvania
 Mill Creek Friends Meetinghouse, Newark, New Castle County, Delaware
 Nine Partners Meeting House and Cemetery, Millbrook, New York
 Oblong Friends Meeting House, in the hamlet of Quaker Hill, in the town of Pawling, Dutchess County, New York
 Old Kennett Meetinghouse, Kennett Township near Chadds Ford, Pennsylvania
 Old Town Friends' Meetinghouse also known as Aisquith Street Meeting, Baltimore Meeting or Patapsco, Baltimore, Maryland
 Pembroke Friends Meetinghouse, Pembroke, Plymouth County, Massachusetts
 Portsmouth Friends Meetinghouse Parsonage and Cemetery
 Poughkeepsie Meeting House (Hooker Avenue), Poughkeepsie, New York
 Poughkeepsie Meeting House (Montgomery Street), Poughkeepsie, New York
 Race Street Friends Meetinghouse, Philadelphia, Pennsylvania
 Sandy Spring Friends Meetinghouse, Sandy Spring, Montgomery County, Maryland
 Schuylkill Friends Meeting House, Phoenixville, Pennsylvania
 Seaville Friends Meeting House, Seaville community, Upper Township, New Jersey, Cape May County, New Jersey, this 1716–1727 meeting house is the smallest frame Quaker meeting house in the United States.
 Smith Clove Meetinghouse, Highland Mills, NY
 Smithfield Friends Meeting House, Parsonage & Cemetery
 South River Friends Meetinghouse, Lynchburg, Virginia
 South Starksboro Friends Meeting House and Cemetery, Starksboro, Vermont
 Stony Brook Meeting House and Cemetery, Princeton, Mercer County, New Jersey
 Third Haven Meeting House, Easton, Talbot County, Maryland
 Upper Dublin Friends Meeting House
 West Grove Friends Spring Meeting House, Alamance County, NC
 Whittier First Friends Church, Whittier, California
 Yardley Friends Meeting House, Yardley, Pennsylvania
 York Meetinghouse, York, York County, Pennsylvania

United Kingdom
See also the list of Friends Meeting Houses in England

  Blackheath Quaker Meeting House in south-east London, England
  Brigflatts Meeting House, near Sedbergh, Cumbria, England
  Brighton Friends Meeting House, Brighton, East Sussex, England
  Come-to-Good Friends Meeting House, Kea, near Truro, Cornwall, UK. It was also known as Kea Meeting House and Feock Meeting House.
  Quaker Meetinghouse, Woodhouse, Sheffield, England
  Godalming Friends Meeting House, Godalming, Surrey, England
  Howgills, Letchworth Garden City, Hertfordshire, England
  Ifield Friends Meeting House, Ifield neighbourhood of Crawley, West Sussex, England
  Jordans Friends Meeting House, Buckinghamshire, England
  Leicester Friends Meeting House
  Littlehampton Friends Meeting House, Littlehampton, part of the Arun district of West Sussex, England
  Osmotherley Friends Meeting House, North Yorkshire, England

References

Notes

Bibliography
 Alexander, William. Observations on the Construction and Fitting Up of Meeting Houses &c for Public Worship: Illustrated by Plans, Sections and Description, Including One Lately Erected in the City of York, Embracing in Particular the Method of Warming and Ventilating. York, England: the author, 1820.
 Butler, David, The Quaker Meeting Houses of Britain, Friends Historical Society, 1999. .
 Lippincott, Horace Mather.  Abington Friends Meeting and School: 1682–1949.  n.p.: n.p., 1949.
 Rose, Harold Wickliffe. The Colonial Houses of Worship in America. New York: Hastings House, Publishers, 1963.

External links

Flickr site for photographs of British Friends Meeting Houses, arranged by County
Hopewell Centre Monthly Meeting of the Religious Society of Friends "Quakers  The Hopewell Meeting House was built in 1759 to 1761 and enlarged during 1788–1791.
Haverford College triptych tri-college digital library, collection of photographs of meeting houses in the United States
Randolph Friends Meeting House
Friends meeting houses UK search

 01
Quakerism
Christian buildings and structures
Types of church buildings